Zhenjian Yang is a Chinese film producer and screenwriter.

Filmography
 Painted Skin, (2008)
 Painted Skin: The Resurrection, (creative supervisor)
 The Wrath of Vajra, (2013, also screenwriter)
 Asura, (2018, also screenwriter)

See also
Chinese film people

References

Chinese film producers
Year of birth missing (living people)
Living people
Place of birth missing (living people)